Xiangdong Ji (born 1962) is a Chinese theoretical nuclear and elementary particle physicist.

Xiangdong Ji received his bachelor's degree from Tongji University in 1982 and his PhD from Drexel University in 1987. He was a postdoctoral researcher at Caltech and MIT. In 1991, he became Assistant Professor at the MIT, and in 1996 he moved to the University of Maryland, where he was the chair of the Maryland Center for Fundamental Physics from 2007 to 2009. He is also professor and chair of the Institute for Nuclear and Particle Physics at Shanghai Jiao Tong University. Since 2005, he has also been a visiting professor at Peking University.

Ji was elected a fellow of the American Physical Society in 2000, "[f]or fundamental contributions to the understanding of the structure of the nucleon and the process of deeply virtual Compton scattering." In 2014 he won the Humboldt Prize and in 2015 he won the Outstanding Nuclear Physicists Award from the Jefferson Sciences Associates. In 2000, he became a fellow of the American Physical Society. In 2003, he won the Oversea Outstanding Chinese Scientist Award.

In 2016 he won the Herman Feshbach Prize in Theoretical Nuclear Physics for pioneering work in developing tools to characterize the structure of the nucleon within QCD and for showing how its properties can be probed through experiments; this work not only illuminates the nucleon theoretically but also acts as a driver of experimental programs worldwide.

In addition to his focus on nuclear physics, he also works on dark matter physics using liquid xenon detectors (a variety of neutrinos being candidates for dark matter), leptogenesis, neutrino mass and neutrino oscillation in GUT models.

References

External links 

 Profile at the University of Maryland.
 

Chinese nuclear physicists
21st-century Chinese physicists
Particle physicists
1962 births
Living people
Fellows of the American Physical Society